Biarmosuchidae is a family of biarmosuchian therapsids from Russia.

References

Biarmosuchians
Prehistoric therapsid families
Fossil taxa described in 1962